Darkness, My Old Friend is a novel by bestselling author Lisa Unger. It is the second book set in The Hollows, and features Jones Cooper.

Awards and honors
Darkness, My Old Friend was a top book pick from both Family Circle Magazine and Washington Life Magazine.

References

2011 American novels
American crime novels
Novels by Lisa Unger
Crown Publishing Group books